"Good Directions" is a song written by Luke Bryan and Rachel Thibodeau and recorded by American country music artist Billy Currington. It was released in September 2006 as the third and final single from Currington’s 2005 album Doin' Somethin' Right. The song became Currington’s second number one hit on the U.S. Billboard Hot Country Songs chart and spent three weeks at that position.

Content
The song's narrator is a man who is selling turnips at a roadside stand. A beautiful woman pulls up in a car, asking the man for directions to an undisclosed Interstate, which the man then gives and suggests that woman stop by a little country store to try some of Miss Belle's sweet tea. The man then regrets sending the woman away without even asking for her name. However, he later sees the woman return to his stand per the suggestion in the Miss Belle verse, who is revealed to be the narrator's mother ("When she stopped in and asked Miss Bell for some of her sweet tea, Mama gave her a big 'ol glass and sent her right back here to me"). Upon seeing the woman return, he says "Thank God for good directions and turnip greens."

This moderate tempo tune is set in the key of F major with a chord progression of F-Am-B-C with Currington’s vocals ranging from C-F.

Other recordings
Luke Bryan, who wrote the song, recorded the song as a bonus track to his debut studio album I'll Stay Me.

Chart performance
"Good Directions" reached its peak of number one on the U.S. Billboard Hot Country Songs chart for the week of May 26, 2007, and spent the next two weeks at that position.

Year-end charts

Certifications

References

2005 songs
2006 singles
Billy Currington songs
Luke Bryan songs
Songs written by Luke Bryan
Song recordings produced by Carson Chamberlain
Mercury Nashville singles